Terry Anderson may refer to:

 Terry Anderson (American football) (born 1955)
 Terry Anderson (footballer) (1944–1980), English association footballer
 Terry Anderson (musician) (born 1956), American musician
 Terry A. Anderson (born 1947), American journalist and former hostage
 Terry L. Anderson, free market environmentalist
Terence Anderson (sport shooter) (born c. 1946), Australian-born American sports shooter